The 2014 Sunshine Coast Rugby Union season will be the 33rd season of the rugby union competition on Australia's Sunshine Coast.

The season opened on April 26 with Maroochydore losing to Noosa 55-10 at Cotton Tree Oval in Maroochydore and University defeating Caloundra 38-9 at the University Oval, Sippy Downs. The season is scheduled to conclude on 27 September with the SCRU Grand Final.

Round 1

|- bgcolor="#CCCCFF"
| width=125px | Home team
| width=125px | Home team score
| width=125px | Away team
| width=125px | Away team score
| width=125px | Venue
| width=125px | Reference
| width=125px | Date
|- bgcolor="#FFFFFF"
| Maroochydore
| 10
| Noosa
| 55
| Cotton Tree Oval, Maroochydore
| 
| 26 April 2014
|- bgcolor="#FFFFFF"
| University
| 38
| Caloundra
| 9
| University of the Sunshine Coast, Sippy Downs
| 
| 26 April 2014
|- bgcolor="#FFFFFF"
| Toads
|
| bye
|
|
|
|

Round 2 

|- bgcolor="#CCCCFF"
| width=125px | Home team
| width=125px | Home team score
| width=125px | Away team
| width=125px | Away team score
| width=125px | Venue
| width=125px | Reference
| width=125px | Date
|- bgcolor="#FFFFFF"
| Toads
| 20
| University
| 27
| Victory Park, Woombye
| 
| 3 May 2014
|- bgcolor="#FFFFFF"
| Caloundra
| 22
| Maroochydore
| 43
| Arther St, Caloundra
| 
| 3 May 2014
|- bgcolor="#FFFFFF"
| Noosa
|
| bye
|
|
|
|

Round 3 

|- bgcolor="#CCCCFF"
| width=125px | Home team
| width=125px | Home team score
| width=125px | Away team
| width=125px | Away team score
| width=125px | Venue
| width=125px | Reference
| width=125px | Date
|- bgcolor="#FFFFFF"
| Noosa
| 26
| Caloundra
| 11
| Dolphin Oval, Sunshine Beach
| 
| 10 May 2014
|- bgcolor="#FFFFFF"
| Maroochydore
| 17
| Toads
| 24
| Cotton Tree Oval, Maroochydore
| 
| 10 May 2014
|- bgcolor="#FFFFFF"
| University
|
| bye
|
|
|
|

Round 4 

|- bgcolor="#CCCCFF"
| width=125px | Home team
| width=125px | Home team score
| width=125px | Away team
| width=125px | Away team score
| width=125px | Venue
| width=125px | Reference
| width=125px | Date
|- bgcolor="#FFFFFF"
| University
| 64
| Maroochydore
| 0
| University of the Sunshine Coast, Sippy Downs
| 
| 24 May 2014
|- bgcolor="#FFFFFF"
| Toads
| 18
| Noosa
| 36
| Victory Park, Woombye
| 
| 24 May 2014
|- bgcolor="#FFFFFF"
| Caloundra
|
| bye
|
|
|
|

Round 5 

|- bgcolor="#CCCCFF"
| width=125px | Home team
| width=125px | Home team score
| width=125px | Away team
| width=125px | Away team score
| width=125px | Venue
| width=125px | Reference
| width=125px | Date
|- bgcolor="#FFFFFF"
| Caloundra
| 30
| Toads
| 22
| Arther St, Caloundra
| 
| 31 May 2014
|- bgcolor="#FFFFFF"
| Noosa
| 13
| University
| 15
| Dolphin Oval, Sunshine Beach
| 
| 31 May 2014
|- bgcolor="#FFFFFF"
| Maroochydore
|
| bye
|
|
|
|

Round 6 

|- bgcolor="#CCCCFF"
| width=125px | Home team
| width=125px | Home team score
| width=125px | Away team
| width=125px | Away team score
| width=125px | Venue
| width=125px | Reference
| width=125px | Date
|- bgcolor="#FFFFFF"
| Noosa
| 25
| Maroochydore
| 16
| Dolphin Oval, Sunshine Beach
| 
| 14 June 2014
|- bgcolor="#FFFFFF"
| Caloundra
| 22
| University
| 31
| Lighthouse Park, Caloundra
| 
| 14 June 2014
|- bgcolor="#FFFFFF"
| Toads
|
| bye
|
|
|
|

Round 7 

|- bgcolor="#CCCCFF"
| width=125px | Home team
| width=125px | Home team score
| width=125px | Away team
| width=125px | Away team score
| width=125px | Venue
| width=125px | Reference
| width=125px | Date
|- bgcolor="#FFFFFF"
| University
| 22
| Toads
| 49
| University of the Sunshine Coast, Sippy Downs
| 
| 21 June 2014
|- bgcolor="#FFFFFF"
| Maroochydore
| 20
| Caloundra
| 21
| Cotton Tree Oval, Maroochydore
| 
| 21 June 2014
|- bgcolor="#FFFFFF"
| Noosa
|
| bye
|
|
|
|

Round 8

|- bgcolor="#CCCCFF"
| width=125px | Home team
| width=125px | Home team score
| width=125px | Away team
| width=125px | Away team score
| width=125px | Venue
| width=125px | Reference
| width=125px | Date
|- bgcolor="#FFFFFF"
| Caloundra
| 8
| Noosa
| 22
| Lighthouse Park, Caloundra
| 
| 28 June 2014
|- bgcolor="#FFFFFF"
| Toads
| 31
| Maroochydore
| 24
| Victory Park, Woombye
| 
| 28 June 2014
|- bgcolor="#FFFFFF"
| University
|
| bye
|
|
|
|

Round 9 

|- bgcolor="#CCCCFF"
| width=125px | Home team
| width=125px | Home team score
| width=125px | Away team
| width=125px | Away team score
| width=125px | Venue
| width=125px | Reference
| width=125px | Date
|- bgcolor="#FFFFFF"
| University
| 27
| Maroochydore
| 3
| University Oval
| 
| 5 July 2014
|- bgcolor="#FFFFFF"
| Noosa
| 18
| Toads
| 13
| Dolphin Oval, Sunshine Beach
| 
| 5 July 2014
|- bgcolor="#FFFFFF"
| Caloundra
|
| bye
|
|
|
|

Round 10 

|- bgcolor="#CCCCFF"
| width=125px | Home team
| width=125px | Home team score
| width=125px | Away team
| width=125px | Away team score
| width=125px | Venue
| width=125px | Reference
| width=125px | Date
|- bgcolor="#FFFFFF"
| Toads
| 14
| Caloundra
| 14
| Victory Park, Woombye
|
| 12 July 2014
|- bgcolor="#FFFFFF"
| University
| 15
| Noosa
| 24
| University Oval, Sippy Downs
|
| 12 July 2014
|- bgcolor="#FFFFFF"
| Maroochydore
|
| bye
|
|
|
|

Round 11

|- bgcolor="#CCCCFF"
| width=125px | Home team
| width=125px | Home team score
| width=125px | Away team
| width=125px | Away team score
| width=125px | Venue
| width=125px | Reference
| width=125px | Date
|- bgcolor="#FFFFFF"
| Maroochydore
|
| Noosa
|
| Cotton Tree
|
| 19 July 2014
|- bgcolor="#FFFFFF"
| University
|
| Caloundra
|
| University Oval
|
| 19 July 2014
|- bgcolor="#FFFFFF"
| Toads
|
| bye
|
|
|
|

Round 12 

|- bgcolor="#CCCCFF"
| width=125px | Home team
| width=125px | Home team score
| width=125px | Away team
| width=125px | Away team score
| width=125px | Venue
| width=125px | Reference
| width=125px | Date
|- bgcolor="#FFFFFF"
| Toads
|
| University
|
| Victory Park, Woombye
|
| 2 August 2014
|- bgcolor="#FFFFFF"
| Caloundra
|
| Maroochydore
|
| Arther St, Caloundra
|
| 2 August 2014
|- bgcolor="#FFFFFF"
| Noosa
|
| bye
|
|
|
|

Round 13 

|- bgcolor="#CCCCFF"
| width=125px | Home team
| width=125px | Home team score
| width=125px | Away team
| width=125px | Away team score
| width=125px | Venue
| width=125px | Reference
| width=125px | Date
|- bgcolor="#FFFFFF"
| Noosa
|
| Caloundra
|
| Sunshine Beach
|
| 9 August 2014
|- bgcolor="#FFFFFF"
| Maroochydore
|
| Toads
|
| Cotton Tree
|
| 9 August 2014
|- bgcolor="#FFFFFF"
| University
|
| bye
|
|
|
|

Round 14 

|- bgcolor="#CCCCFF"
| width=125px | Home team
| width=125px | Home team score
| width=125px | Away team
| width=125px | Away team score
| width=125px | Venue
| width=125px | Reference
| width=125px | Date
|- bgcolor="#FFFFFF"
| University
|
| Maroochydore
|
| Cotton Tree Oval, Maroochydore
|
| 16 August 2014
|- bgcolor="#FFFFFF"
| Toads
|
| Noosa
|
| Woombye
|
| 16 August 2014
|- bgcolor="#FFFFFF"
| Caloundra
|
| bye
|
|
|
|

Round 15 

|- bgcolor="#CCCCFF"
| width=125px | Home team
| width=125px | Home team score
| width=125px | Away team
| width=125px | Away team score
| width=125px | Venue
| width=125px | Reference
| width=125px | Date
|- bgcolor="#FFFFFF"
| Caloundra
|
| Toads
|
| Arther St, Caloundra
|
| 23 August 2014
|- bgcolor="#FFFFFF"
| Noosa
|
| University
|
| Victory Park, Woombye
|
| 23 August 2014
|- bgcolor="#FFFFFF"
| Maroochydore
|
| bye
|
|
|
|

Semi finals

|- bgcolor="#CCCCFF"
| width=125px | Home team
| width=125px | Home team score
| width=125px | Away team
| width=125px | Away team score
| width=125px | Venue
| width=125px | Reference
| width=125px | Date
|- bgcolor="#C0C0C0"
| colspan=7 | Major Semi Final
|- bgcolor="#FFFFFF"
| University/Noosa
|
| University/Noosa
|
| TBD
|
| 30 August 2014
|- bgcolor="#C0C0C0"
| colspan=7 | Minor Semi Final
|- bgcolor="#FFFFFF"
| Toads/Caloundra/Maroochydore
|
| Toads/Caloundra/Maroochydore
|
| TBD
|
| 30 August 2014

Preliminary final

|- bgcolor="#CCCCFF"
| width=125px | Home team
| width=125px | Home team score
| width=125px | Away team
| width=125px | Away team score
| width=125px | Venue
| width=125px | Reference
| width=125px | Date
|- bgcolor="#C0C0C0"
| colspan=7 | Preliminary Final
|- bgcolor="#FFFFFF"
| University
| 19
| Toads
| 10
| University of the Sunshine Coast
| 
| 6 September 2014

Grand final

|- bgcolor="#CCCCFF"
| width=125px | Home team
| width=125px | Home team score
| width=125px | Away team
| width=125px | Away team score
| width=125px | Venue
| width=125px | Reference
| width=125px | Date
|- bgcolor="#C0C0C0"
| colspan=7 | Grand Final
|- bgcolor="#FFFFFF"
| Noosa
| 10
| University
| 9
| Sunshine Coast Stadium
| 
| 13 September 2014

References
Sunshine Coast Rugby Union

External links
 Video Playlist

Rugby union competitions in Queensland
Sunshine Coast Rugby Union
Sunshine Coast Rugby Union
Articles containing video clips